Sohrab Shaheed Salles or Sohrab Shahid-Saless (June 28, 1944 in Tehran, Iran – July 2, 1998 in Chicago, Illinois) was an Iranian film director and screenwriter and one of the most celebrated figures in Iranian cinema in the 20th century. After 1976 he worked in the cinema of Germany and was an important component of the film diaspora working in the German industry.

Film career
After the revolution aftermaths in Iran and with restrictions faced by film makers and the difficulties of acquiring raw 35 mm film rolls, he made his first feature,  the milestone film A Simple Event (1973), he describes the everyday life of a ten-year-old boy living in a small town with an ill mother and a father struggling to make a living smuggling fish. In contrast, Still Life (1974) explores the monotony in the life of an old railway switchman – a film that won many prizes, including one at the 1974 Berlinale. In 1975 Sohrab directed Far from Home (1975).

In 1976 on moving to Germany Sohrab released Diary of a Lover (1976), Coming of Age (1976), and Utopia (1983). Utopia is a 186-minute film regarded by critics as a "hard ghetto film" and is the tale of a pimp and his five girls. The film was entered into the 33rd Berlin International Film Festival.

Filmography as director

Short
Raghs-e Bojnourd (Dance of Bojnourd) (Short) 1969
Rastakhiz (Resurrection) (Documentary short) 1969
Siah-o sefid (black and white) (Short) 1972

Features & TV movies
Yek ettefāq-e sāde (A simple event), 1973.
Ṭabiʿat-e bijān (Still life), 1974.
Dar qorbat (Far from home), 1975.
Reifezeit (Coming of age), 1976.
Tagebuch eines Liebenden (Diary of a Lover), 1977.
Die langen Ferien der Lotte H. Eisner (The long vacation of Lotte H. Eisner), 1979.
Grabbes Letzter Sommer (The last summer of Grabbe), 1980.
 (Order), 1980.
Anton P. Checkov: A life (1981.
Empfänger unbekannt (Addressee unknown), 1983.
Utopia, 1983.
Der Weidenbaum (The willow tree), 1984.
Hans – Ein Junge in Deutschland (Hans: A young man in Germany), 1985.
Wechselbalg (Changeling), 1987.
Rosen für Afrika (Roses for Africa), 1992.

Awards and accolades
Sohrab Shaheed Salles won 12 professional film awards and 3 nominations during his career.
1972 Ob? , Best Documentary, National Tehran Film Festival.
1972 black and white, Golden Plaque, Tehran International Children's Film Festival
1973 A simple event, Golden Ibex for Best Director at the International Film Festival in Tehran
1974 Price of the Catholic and Protestant Film Jury as part of the Young Forum at the International Film Festival Berlin
1974 Still Life, Silver Bear Award of the International Film Critics Prize of the Protestant jury, International Film Festival [3 ]In 1975 the stranger, Prize of the International Film Critics, International Film Festival Berlin
1976 ripening period, Bronze Hugo, Chicago International Film Festival
1977 Diary of a lover Special Film Award of the British Film Institute, London Film Festival1977 Documenta 6 in Kassel
1980 order, Silver Hugo, Chicago International Film Festival Participation in the Cannes Film Festival Week of directors .
1981 Grabbes Last Summer, three Grimme prices with Gold: Best Director, Best Screenplay, Best Male Actor. Best TV Movie of the Year [4 ] , the price of the North Rhine-Westphalian Minister of Culture for best director .
1984 Utopia Award of the Academy of Performing Arts : Best Film of the year.
1991 Roses for Africa, International Film Festival Hof.

See also
Iranian cinema

References

 Pardis Minuchehr,

External links
 
 http://www.saless.de - a German homepage, devoted to the life and work of Saless
http://www.nostalgiafortheelsewhere.com/- A Retrospective homepage on German works of Shahid Saless

1944 births
1998 deaths
German-language film directors
Iranian film directors
Iranian screenwriters
People from Qazvin
Persian-language film directors
Silver Bear for Best Director recipients
20th-century screenwriters